Cornelius Van Alen Van Dyck, M.D. (August 13, 1818 – November 13, 1895) was an American missionary physician, teacher and translator of the Protestant Bible into Arabic.

Life
Cornelius Van Alen Van Dyck was born at Kinderhook, New York, and educated at Jefferson Medical College, Philadelphia, from which he graduated as M.D. in 1839.

In 1840, he was sent to Lebanon by the American Board of Commissioners for Foreign Missions as a medical missionary for the Dutch Reformed Church, and he was stationed at Beirut, Abeih, Sidon, and Mount Tabor. He studied Arabic in Beirut under Butrus al-Bustani and Nasif al-Yaziji, both of whom later became famous Arab writers, and Yusuf al-Asir, with whom he would later collaborate in translating the Bible into Arabic. He married Julia Abbott, daughter of the former British consul-general in Beirut, in December 1842.

In June 1843, they moved to 'Abeih, where, with W. M. Thomson, he organized a secondary school for training evangelical ministers. Noting the scarcity of suitable teaching materials in Arabic, he proceeded to write Arabic textbooks on geography, navigation, natural history, and mathematics, which were long used in Syrian schools. He also studied theology and was ordained a minister by his fellow missionaries in 1846, shortly before the inauguration of the Abeih Seminary.

In 1849, he was abruptly transferred from 'Abeih to Sidon, where he was expected to open a new mission station, preach, and practice medicine. Upon returning to Beirut in 1857, he began to work on the Arabic Bible. After completing the translation in 1865, he went to New York to supervise its printing, also teaching Hebrew for two years at Union Theological Seminary and studying ophthalmology.

On returning to Beirut, Van Dyck became a professor of pathology and internal medicine in the medical school of the newly founded Syrian Protestant College, which later became the American University of Beirut. He also taught astronomy in its literary section, directed its observatory and meteorological station as well as the mission press, and edited its weekly journal al-Nashran. He wrote Arabic textbooks on chemistry, internal medicine, physical diagnosis, and astronomy, publishing some of them at his own expense.

He translated al-Razi's ninth-century treatise on smallpox and measles, adding a critical commentary. Often called al-Hakim during his lifetime, Van Dyck had a large medical practice in addition to his academic duties.

Lewis affair
He resigned from the Syrian Protestant College after the 1882 commencement address by Professor Edwin Lewis, which was censored by the college board for mildly favoring Charles Darwin's theory of evolution by natural selection, considered heretical by most Protestants. He stayed in Beirut, practicing at the Hospital of St. George as its chief physician. He published more books in Arabic, including a translation of Lew Wallace's Ben Hur.

In 1890, Syrians of all sects celebrated the fiftieth anniversary of his coming to their country. He retired in 1893 and died in Beirut.

Reputation
Van Dyck has long been respected by Arabs for his intimate knowledge of their history, culture, language, and proverbs, for his ability to work among Syrians without condescension, and especially for his contribution to the revival of Arabic literature in the nineteenth century.

Modern scholars give more credit for the renaissance to the Egyptian government and to some of Van Dyck's Arab collaborators, but he published more than twenty Arabic textbooks, and his translation of the Bible was used by Arabic-speaking Protestants for a century.

Rue Van Dyck is a street in Beirut that was named in his honor.

Family
State Senator Henry H. Van Dyck (1809–1888) was his brother.

References

Further reading
 Goldschmidt, Arthur. "Van Dyck, Cornelius Van Alen," American National Biography. available online at http://www.anb.org/articles/20/20-01044.html.
 van Kyck, E. A. 1961. "Cornelius Van Allen Van Dyck." The Bible Translator 12/4:200-201. Available online
 al-Muqattam (Cairo daily newspaper), November 16, 1895.
 Penrose, Stephen B. That They May Have Life: The Story of the American University of Beirut, 1866-1941 (1941), pp. 36–37.
 Tibawi, A. L. American Interests in Syria, 1800-1901 (1966).
 Sarkis, Yusuf. Mu'jam al-Matbu'at al-'arabiyah wa al-mu'arrabah, Vol. 2 (1928), cols. 1462–4.
 Zaydan, Jurji. Tarajim mashahir al-sharq, vol. 2 (1903), pp. 39–53.
 al-Zirikli, Khayr al-Din, al-A'lam, 4th ed. (1980), vol. 5, p. 223.

External links
 
 

American Protestant missionaries
Christian medical missionaries
Protestant missionaries in Lebanon
Translators of the Bible into Arabic
American people of Dutch descent
1818 births
1895 deaths
Thomas Jefferson University alumni
Protestant missionaries in Palestine (region)
American expatriates in Lebanon
American members of the Dutch Reformed Church
Dutch Reformed Church missionaries
American University of Beirut
19th-century American translators
Missionary linguists